Farquet may refer to:

 Damien Farquet (b. 1971), Swiss ski mountaineer and cross-country skier
 Ernest Farquet (b. 1975), Swiss ski mountaineer